Robert Garrett (born 5 May 1988) is a Northern Irish semi-professional footballer who plays as a midfielder for NIFL Premiership side Glenavon. He has previously played for Stoke City, Wrexham, FC Edmonton and Portadown.

Club career
Garrett joined Stoke City in 2002 and played just twice for the club both coming as a substitute in games towards the end of the 2005–06 season. In the 2006–07 season, Garrett enjoyed a loan spell at Football League Two side Wrexham. He returned to Wrexham again on loan in the 2007–08 season. In the summer of 2007 Garrett returned to Belfast and joined Linfield and became one of their most important players. As Linfield added more quality to their midfield Robert's first team chances dried up, at which stage he had to consider his future.

On 16 April 2013 Garrett followed fellow Linfield men Daryl Fordyce and Albert Watson joining 
NASL club FC Edmonton on loan for their 2013 season.

On 2 May 2014, it was confirmed that Garrett had signed for Portadown.
Garrett captained the Ports for the first time in a 2–2 draw with Glenavon in 2016.

It was announced in May 2017 that Garrett would be returning to Linfield.

On 16 January 2019, it was announced that Garrett had joined Glenavon on a -year deal.

International career
In May 2009, Garrett received his first call up to the Northern Ireland squad for a friendly with Italy in Pisa. He was one of five Irish League players called up, one of which was former Linfield teammate Alan Mannus.

Career statistics

Club

International
Source:

References

External links

1988 births
Living people
Association footballers from Northern Ireland
Northern Ireland B international footballers
Northern Ireland international footballers
Stoke City F.C. players
Wrexham A.F.C. players
English Football League players
Linfield F.C. players
NIFL Premiership players
Portadown F.C. players
Expatriate association footballers from Northern Ireland
Northern Ireland under-21 international footballers
FC Edmonton players
Expatriate soccer players in Canada
North American Soccer League players
Association football midfielders
Glenavon F.C. players